The International Comic Arts Forum (originally International Comics and Animation Festival, ICAF) is an academic conference and international comic convention held every autumn in Washington, D.C. It was founded in 1995 by Georgetown University's Department of French. The second event in 1996 saw collaboration with the French embassy in Washington. Beginning in 1997, it has been held in conjunction many times with the Small Press Expo (SPX). In 2006 the event changed its name to the current form.

Both ICAF and SPX were cancelled in 2001 due to creators' travel difficulties related to the September 11, 2001 attacks.

The event has been described as one of the earliest academic initiatives for the study of comics.

References

External links
Official website

Animation film festivals in the United States
Film festivals in Washington, D.C.
Georgetown University
Recurring events established in 1995
Comics conventions in the United States

Film festivals established in 1995